Rickles is a surname. Notable people with the surname include:

 Dean Rickles (born 1977), academic
 Don Rickles (1926–2017), American stand-up comedian and actor
 Donald Rickles (1927–1985), American radio and television announcer, news anchor, and actor
 Larry Rickles (1970–2011), American screenwriter, film, and television producer
 Nick Rickles (born 1990), American-Israeli baseball player